Edward Kofi Omane Boamah is a Health Policy Planning and Financing Expert, a Medical Practitioner  and a Ghanaian Politician who served as the Minister for Communications and Spokesperson to the President of the Republic of Ghana. Omane Boamah is a member of the National Democratic Congress.

Education 
He attended Pope John Senior High School and Minor Seminary in Koforidua, Ghana. He is an alumnus of the University of Ghana Medical School, where he trained as a Medical Doctor. He did a stint at the Washington University School of Medicine in St. Louis, Missouri, USA. In addition, he holds a master's degree in Health Policy Planning and Financing from both London School of Economics and London School of Hygiene and Tropical Medicine.  As a student he served students’ body as the: President of the National Union of Ghana Students (NUGS) and the Coordinating Secretary of the Federation of Ghana Medical Students Association (FGMSA).

Political career

Deputy Minister for Environment, Science and Technology 
From 2009 to 2012, he served as a deputy minister for environment, science and technology and later National Democratic Congress's deputy campaign coordinator in the 2012 general elections. He also served as the vice chairman of the United Nations Commission on Science and Technology for Development (UNCSTD).

As a deputy minister for environment, science and technology, he chaired the committees which investigated the spillage of Low Toxicity Oil Based Mud (LTOBM) by KOSMOS Energy in the Jubilee Offshore Field – West Cape Three Points in Ghana and  the spillage of sodium cyanide in a water body in Kenyase, Ghana, by Newmont Ghana Gold Limited. During his tenure the government invested in a nationwide tree planting address issues relating to global warming and excessive cutting down of trees which threatens the world.

Deputy Minister of Youth and Sports 
Omane Boamah served as Deputy Minister for Youth and Sport in the administration of President John Evans Attah-Mills from 2012 to 2013.

Minister for Communications 
He was appointed in February 2013 by President John Mahama after the Ghanaian general election in December 2012, Spokesperson to the President of Ghana, H.E John Dramani Mahama from August 2014 to January 2017.  Prior to this appointments, he was assigned the responsibility of coordinating Ghana's participation in the 2013 Africa Cup of Nations (AfCON 2013).

As Minister for Communications, he was an advocate for the protection of children online. He responded to the growing cyber threats by setting up the National Computer Emergence Response Team and a National Committee on Child Online Protection to develop a national child online protection framework and usage of the internet.

He also served as a Member of the Board of Ghana AIDS Commission from 2014 to 2016.

Medical career 
He also served as a member of the WHO volunteers monitoring the 2004 Expanded Programme on Immunisation in the Asuagyaman District in the Eastern Region of Ghana and also a member of the Medical Rescue team for the "May 9, 2001 Stadium Disaster" in Ghana.

After his party, National Democratic Congress lost the 2016 General Election he went back to practising medicine and is currently a board member of the Afrah International Hospital where he consults as well.

Notable previous assignments
Spokesperson to the President of the Republic of Ghana, H.E John Dramani Mahama.
Coordinator of Ghana's participation in the 2013 Africa Cup of Nations 
Chairman of Investigative Committees on the spillage of Low Toxicity Oil Based Mud (LTOBM) by KOSMOS Energy in the Jubilee Offshore Field – West Cape Three Points in Ghana and  the spillage of Sodium Cyanide in a Water Body in Kenyase, Ghana, by Newmont Ghana Gold Limited.

See also
List of Mahama government ministers
National Democratic Congress

References

Living people
Year of birth missing (living people)
Government ministers of Ghana
National Democratic Congress (Ghana) politicians
University of Ghana alumni
University of Ghana Medical School alumni
Ghanaian medical doctors
Alumni of the London School of Economics
Pope John Senior High School and Minor Seminary alumni